Nunzio Filogamo (20 September 1902 – 24 January 2002) was an Italian television and radio presenter, actor and singer.

Life and career 
Born in Palermo, Filogamo moved to Turin at a young age, then he studied law at the Sorbonne University and at the Turin University, where he graduated.

After working for two years as a lawyer, he started a career as a stage actor, entering the companies of Dina Galli and of Irma and Emma Gramatica. In 1934 he debuted as a radio actor in the variety show I quattro moschettieri, which lasted four years and gave him a large popularity.

After the outbreak of war, Filogamo was hired to host several variety events for soldiers and wounded people; later, he continued to work as a presenter of the shows reserved for the Allied forces which were held at the Teatro dell'Opera in Rome.

Filogamo's fame is mainly linked to the Sanremo Music Festival, of which he hosted five editions including the first ever. During the second edition of the Festival he coined the famous slogan "Dear friends, near and far, good evening. Good evening wherever you are", which soon became his trademark.

After hosting several television and radio programs, he retired in the 1970s.  During his career Filogamo was also an occasional film actor and a singer; among his best known songs, "Tutto va bene madama la marchesa" and "Povero cagnolino pechinese".

He died, at 99, in a retirement home in Rodello d' Alba, Province of Cuneo.

Filmography

References

External links 

1902 births
2002 deaths
Mass media people from Palermo
Italian television presenters
Italian radio presenters
Italian male stage actors
Italian male film actors
20th-century Italian male actors
20th-century Italian  male singers
Male actors from Palermo